Sultan Nur Ahmed Aman ((1841–1907); Somali nickname Nuur Dheere), was a learned religious leader and the 5th Sultan of the Habr Yunis Sultanate and later also one of the leaders behind the Somali Dervish movement and revolt (1899–1920). He was the principal agitator rallying the followers of the Kob Fardod Tariqa behind his anti-French Roman Catholic Mission campaign that would become the cause of the Dervish uprising. He assisted in assembling men and arms and hosted the revolting tribesmen in his quarter at Burao in August 1899, declaring the Dervish rebellion. He fought and led the war throughout the years 1899–1904. He and his brother Geleh Ahmed (Kila Ahmed) were the main signatories of the Dervish peace treaty with the British, Ethiopians and Italian colonial powers on March 5, 1905, known as the Ilig Treaty or the Pestalozza agreement. Sultan Nur is entombed in a white-domed shrine in Taleh, the location of the largest Dervish forts and the capital of the Dervish from 1912 to 1920, a testimony to his contribution in creating the movement.

Biography

Sultan Nur was the direct paternal descendant of the 18th century Habr Yunis chieftain Ainanshe Hersi and great-grandson of Deria Sugulle Ainanshe who became the paramount Habr Yunis sultan in 1836.  He spent much of his early life before his sultanate as a religious Sufi pupil in Hahi and Berato's Ahmadiyya tariqa (known in Somali regions as Ahmadiyya not to be confused with the Ahmadiyya of Mirza Ghulam Ahmad an Ismaili Shia sect). The Ahmadiyya or properly known as the Idrisiyya tariqa was founded by Ahmad ibn Idris al-Fasi (1760–1837). During Nur's years in the Berato tariqa, the head mullah was one Mohamed Arab. and the head mullah of Hahi tariqa was Haji Musa. According to the wife of Sultan Nur, an Aden-born Somali, Nur could not read or write but he could converse in Arabic. However, according to Hayes Sadler's correspondence, Nur could read and write Arabic.

Nur became a sultan after the death of his uncle, Sultan Hersi Aman (Hersi Aman Sultan Deriyeh Segulleh) (1824–1879), in an intertribal fight. Sultan Hersi, the chief of the Habr Yunis clan since the mid-1850s was killed in an inter-clan war with the sage Haji Guled (Guled Haji Ahmed Segulleh) in 1879, a wise legendary elder who led the Habr Yunis clan, also an uncle of Sultan Hersi. This inter-clan war generated much poetry, celebrated poets emerged during the war, for instance the poems of a young teenager Jama Amuume Jama the mute, a seventeen-year-old who lost two brothers in the war, who later avenged his brothers by killing one Warsame the culprit. One poem of Jama the mute was recorded by the Italian explorer Luigi Robecchi Bricchetti in 1884. There was another poem by a lamenting woman who lost her brother and father in the war, probably the oldest Somali poem on record authored by a woman. Both poems were published in the late nineteenth century.

The ascent of Nur to the sultanate caused a decade-long civil war when his great uncle Awad Sultan Deriyeh and eldest living son of Sultan Deriyeh declared himself a rival sultan in 1881. Drake Brockman a medical doctor in the Somaliland protectorate and the author of British Somaliland narrated the long conflict caused by Nur's ascent to the sultanate in his book

Drake Brockman summarised Nur's story in 1911:

 Deriyeh, the head of the Rer Segulleh, was universally proclaimed Sultan by the rest of the Habr Yunis tribe, and was really the first of the Habr Yunis Sultans, although his father, Segulleh, had tried to pose as such. Sultan Deriyeh lived to a great age, and had no less than eighteen sons, of whom the first two were borne to him by a woman of the Makahil section of the Habr Awal tribe, and the elder of these, Aman by name, joining with his brother, formed the Ba Maka-hil, while his remaining sixteen stepbrothers formed the Baha Deriyeh. Aman had ten sons, the eldest of whom was Ahmed, who died before his father, who himself died before his old father, the aged Sultan Deriyeh. Now, as soon as Sultan Deriyeh died there was trouble as to his successor. The Ba Makahil claimed that Ismail and Hirsi, of their section, were entitled to the honour ; but the Rer Segulleh and some of the Baha Deriyeh, said, "No, as several of the late Sultan's sons are still living, one of them should be their Sultan before any of the grandsons"; so they invited Awid Deriyeh to be their representative. In the meantime, Ismail was killed fighting with the Ogaden and Hirsi by the Baha Segulleh. The Ba Makahil now had to look for another successor, so they sent for Nur, the son of Ahmed Aman, and nephew to Ismail and Hirsi, who was living the life of a Mullah at Hahi, near Odweina. Nur, much against his will, consented to be their Sultan, although he preferred the life he was leading as a Mullah. For some years now there were two Sultans of the Habr Yunis, namely, Sultan Nur of the Habr Yunis, Ba Makahil, and Sultan Awd Deriyeh of the Baha Segulleh; so it will be seen the powerful section of the Baha Segulleh had gone to the Baha Deriyeh for their representative". Awad Deriyeh was killed in a fight with the Ogaden Rer Ali, so the Baha Segulleh had to find another Sultan. Accordingly, they chose his brother Hirsi's son, Mattar; but this choice the Baha Deriyeh were not at all pleased with, so all the Habr Yunis tribe decided to meet and discuss the matter out and decide on one Sultan. After a great deal of discussion the two clans, Ba Makahil and Baha Deriyeh, who had claimants for the sultanate, decided to let them toss for it, the winner to be proclaimed Sultan, while the loser got one hundred camels as compensation from the winner. Sultan Nur won, and was proclaimed Sultan of the Habr Yunis tribe.
Nur's ascent to the sultanate in the early 1880s coincided with the Mahdi uprising (1881–1885) Muhammad Ahmad. Various Mahdi and Senussi emissaries visited the Somali coast rallying the population behind their respective Sufi branches.  According to Walsh, the British resident counsel at the Somali coast, these two Sufi sects and their followers occasionally collided in Berbera. Nur welcomed the Senousi emissaries and they were regular visitors to his hamlet according to Walsh. Beyond a few minor encounters with the British at the coast in 1886 and 1892, nothing major occurred. in 1890-1891 Awad Sultan Deriyeh was killed in an Ogaden raid and his nephew Mattar Hersi (Mattar Hersi Sultan Deriyeh) was chosen as a rival sultan by some sections within the Segulleh dynasty, the traditional holders of Habr Yunis sultanate. In February 1899, rival Sultan Madar/Mattar Hersi, after having assisted in recovering raided livestock for the mullahs from Kob Fardod, received support for his sultanate from the religious settlement and Mohammed Abdullah Hassan began to champion Mattar's cause.

Upon a visit to the Habr Je'lo they recited this geeraar praising the Sultan. This poem was recorded by British officer J.W.C. Kirk and included in his book.

A chronology of the first two years of the Dervish movement, February 1899 – March 1901
In mid-February 1899, Mohammed Abdullah Hassan, later the spiritual head of the Dervish movement, for the first time came to the attention of the British authority at Berbera. James Hayes Sadler updating the colonial office on April 12, 1899, stated that the Somali Coastal Administration initially came to hear about this Mullah of Kob Fardod on mid February 1899 when the new Stipendiary Akil Ahmed Muhammad Shermarki (Habr Yunis, Mussa Arrah) raided some livestock belonging to the religious mullahs of Kob Fardod. This incident brought Sultan Nur to the tariqa at Kob Fardod, after Sultan Madar Hirsi, his rival, assisted the mullahs in recovering the stocks and thus gaining the allegiance and support of the tariqa for his rival sultanate.

Contrary to the fanciful adventure later writers wrote about him, the Mullah only came to the attention of the British in February 1899, he never confronted the authority at Berbera upon arrival in 1895 as some claim, nor were there major uprisings in Berbera as official Somali biographies purport, much of this embellishment was a later invention, beyond a few complaints about not receiving their full herds, the mullahs at Kob Fardod and Mohammed Abdullah Hassan had no complaints against the British coastal administration and even the French Roman Catholic Mission which had been established in Berbera since the early 1890s. Mohamed Abdullah Hassan lived in Berbera and his relatives both Duale Liban, a clerk in Berbera customs, and Deria Magan, a personal translator of the council-general, both held high positions in Berbera administration. Mohammed Abdullah Hassan married a sister of Duale Liban and had his first son Mahdi in Berbera in 1893. Throughout the month of March, the Mullahs peacefully corresponded with the coastal authority in friendly terms, requesting the remainder of their herd.

On March 29, 1899, the vice-council at the coast sent a letter to the Mullah requesting the return of a stolen rifle. The Mullah replied in person to this letter as it was addressed to him personally, denying any knowledge of such a matter.

On April 10, camel sowar Ahmed Adan, who carried the letter to the mullah, arrived at Berbera with two replies and made a report to the effect that the assembled mullahs at Kob Fardod and the various tribesmen adopted a hostile attitude and referred to him as a Kafir in addition he reported that a number of them had rifles and were practicing.

On April 20, Dragoman Deria Magan, Hayes Sadler's personal translator and a relative of the Mullah was sent to ascertain the nature of the activities at Kob Fardod. He reported that the Mullah had 52 rifles with about 200 rounds of ammunition and that the various tribesmen Habr Toljaala and Dolbahnata were wavering and they hold no hostile attitude towards the administrations. He added that the Mullah had abandoned the cause of Sultan Madar Hirsi and was now espousing the sultanate of Nur who had recently brought presents and was with him. He also stated that the Mahmood Girad had recently raided the Aligheri.

At the end of April 1899, the dervish movement was declared adopting the term "dervish" to refer to their core followers not their allied clans-men, and they also announced their independence, having their own Amir, Sultan and chiefs. However, they didn't declare war or open hostility, they merely requested to be respected as an independent community.

At the end of June 1899, Sultan Nur leaves the tariqa at Kob Fardod and arrives in his country Odweina in an effort to collect arms and men from the western section of the Habr Yunis clan. On June 27, James Hayes Sadler sent a letter to Nur inquiring about his intentions and involvement in the new movement, no reply was received.

In early July 1899, Sultan Nur called for a tribal assembly for the western Habr Yunis on July 22. However, the assembly was aborted when most of the western Habr Yunis clan refused to join the rebellion. Sultan Nur, failing to convince the western Habr Yunis, left eastward to Burao joining the eastern section of the clan who declared allegiance to the new dervish cause.

In the end of August 1899, the dervish assembled at Burao, declaring an open war. On September 1 a letter arrived from the dervish camp at Burao to Berbera essentially a declaration of war.

In September 1899, after assembling at Burao the Dervish and their clan allies attacked the western Habr Yunis at Odweina under the insistence of Sultan Nur to punish the clansmen who opposed his call to join the rebellion. Also at the end of September they burned and looted the  Ahmadia Tariqa at Sheikh.

In October 1899, the chief of the Dolbahnata, Girad Ali Farah, was murdered by the Dervish. The Dolbahnata chief Girad Ali Farah sent a letter to the British Coastal administration disavowing the Mullah's cause and the Dervish rebellion .

In November 1899, the core Dervish forces crossed the border into Ethiopia and settled at Harradiggit (Hara-Digeed).

In March 1900, the Dervish allies in the Ogaden were defeated at the battle of Jig Jiga, no dervishes participated in this battle.

In July 1900, The Dervishes loot and raid the Aidagalla clan in Ethiopia.

In August 1900, the dervish attack the habr Awal tribe killing 220 including women and children, losing 130 raiders killed.

In October 1900, a combined various Isaq tribes (Samatar/Ahmed Abdalla, Habr Yunis and Aidagalla) attack the dervish and the Ogaden in retaliations crossing the border into Ethiopia.

In March 1901, the dervish reentered Somaliland protectorate after being pushed out by the Abyssinian forces and their Somali tribal allies (Mohamed Zubeir Ogaden)  from the Ethiopian border.

The Somali Dervish History "Taariikhda Daraawiishta Soomaaliyeed" 1899–1920
The Somali Dervish movement was an armed rebellion that abruptly began in the spring of 1899 and lasted some twenty years until 1920. Initially, the rebellion began as an anti-French Roman Catholic Mission revolt. The rebelling mullahs and leaders opposed the church's missionary activities, in particular, the education/adoption of young children and in some instances converting them to Christianity. They also protested what they alleged was an interference in their independence and a persecution of their members by the British Somali Coast administration.

The news of the incident that sparked the Dervish rebellion and to the almost twenty one years insurrection according to the consul-general James Hayes Sadler was either spread or as he alleged was concocted by Sultan Nur. The incident in question was that of a group of Somali children who were converted to Christianity and adopted by the French Catholic Mission at Berbera in 1899. Whether Sultan Nur experienced the incident first hand or whether he was told of it is not clear, but what is known is that he propagated the incident in the Tariqa at Kob Fardod in April 1899, precipitating the religious rebellion that later transformed into the Somali Dervish.

The Christian Somali children incident is erroneously attributed to Mohammed Abdullah Hassan the later spiritual head of the movement. Despite their anti-Christian profession, the dervish in Somaliland targeted primarily Somali nomads who were indifferent to their cause or wholly ignorant of it, for twenty odd years the Dervish wreaked havoc on the Somali nomads, through mostly looting and outright killings.

In 1909 the French Catholic Mission in Berbera was closed by the British colonial administrations, when most of the clans demanded that the mission activity should be suspended, as it was the pretext of the Dervish raids on Somali nomads. They also demanded that the Mullah Mohammed Abdullah Hassan and the Dervish be crushed and finally Risaldar Major Haji Musa Farah the highest native officer of Somaliland and an ardent adversary of the Mullah and the Dervish was to be replaced due to abuse of power. Reginald Wingate and Rudolf Carl von Slatin were tasked in 1909 to ascertain the Somali nomad's attitude to both the administration and the dervish and to advise the British colonial office as to how to improve the situation in the protectorate.

Despite the closing of the French Catholic Mission and the British administration withdrawal to the coast at the end of 1909, the dervish continued to raid and maraud in the interior of the country until 1914, when the British reconquered the interior to pacify the well-armed marauding clans and push the dervish back from endangering the coast.

From 1914 to 1919, the colonial administrator severely eliminated the military power and influence of the dervish in the far interior of the protectorate after a long, slow campaign employing the King's African Rifles (some native Somalis and non-natives included within their rank), and the Somaliland Camel Corps and irregulars called "Ilaalos" or native scouts.

Finally in 1919, a final plan to crush the Dervish using airplanes was devised and between January – February 1920 the dervish forts were bombarded and most of the dervish members either were killed, captured or fled to Ethiopia. A final raid of 3000 Habar Yoonis, Habar Jeclo and Dhulbahante horsemen led by tribal chief Haji Waraba raided the Dervish in Ethiopia putting an end to a movement that terrorized the majority of the Somali nomads irrespective of clan affiliations for two decades.

The movement had its spiritual leader Mohammed Abdullah Hassan, it's Sultan Nur Ahmed Aman and its Chief Lieutenant Ahmed Warsama Haji Sudi.

The beginning of  Dervish movement April–August 1899

This incident brought Sultan Nur to Kob Fardod around March, 1899. Sultan Nur's main objective was to dislodge his rival Madar and to gain the allegiance of the mullahs of Kob Fardod.
In March 1899, one Duwaleh Hirsi, a former member of the Somali Aden police, then Mr Percy Cox's (former counsel-resident of Zeila and Berbera, 1893–1895) expedition guide in Somaliland allegedly stole a rifle and sold it to the tariqa at Kob Fardod. The vice-counsel at the coast Harry Edward Spiller Cordeaux sent a letter to the mullahs at Kob Fardod demanding the return of the rifle. Sultaan Nur was in Kob Fardod from March–June 1899. The letter was carried by a Somali mounted police officer named Ahmed Adan, upon his return after the delivery of the letter Cordeaux interviewed Adan and he provided the following information:

I knew many of the people there—some of them were relations of mine. My brother-in-law, Dualeh Aoreb, was there. I asked them if they had any rifles, they said they at first had only six, but had just received fifty-five from Hafoon. I saw two or three of the new lot, they are Martins(new). They told me they had one or two "14-shot rifles". I saw some Mullahs walking about with Sniders. The Sheikh himself and some of his Mullahs used to practice daily shooting at a target; they put up a shield against a tree. I used to talk with people every day. We talked about many things, some of the words they said were good and others were bad. They called me a Kafir, and laughed at my uniform, saying that I smelt, and asking me why I wore the Sircars clothes. There were hundreds of people there, some from every tribe, Dolbahanta, Habr Toljaala, and Habr Yunis.

What is particularly revealing about Ahmed Adan's interview is the confusion that was caused by another letter carried by a Somali one Salan supposedly a message also from the British administration at the coast. This second letter angered the mullahs at the Tariqa;

The second letter provoked the mullahs, the hostile tone in the reply is due to the offensive second letter carried by Salan the Somali. Both replies, one regarding the rifle curt but relatively inoffensive and a second addressing the confusing insolent second letter are in the British record.

Deria Magan, a relative of the Mullah Mohamed Abdullah Hassan (the later spiritual head of the movement), and chief translator of the Somali coastal administration since 1884 visited the tariqa, he added nothing new to the general information gathered earlier by Ahmed Aden other than the fact that purportedly some clans are leaving the mullah and that the mullahs have abandoned Madar Hersi and were now paying allegiances to Sultan Nur, whose sultanate the Mullahs are now embracing, .

Another letter from the mullahs at Kob Fardod arrived at the coast on May 3, 1899, this letter had an overall beseeching neutral tone. The mullahs pleaded with the administration not to escalate the manner and pleaded to be left alone; but what is noteworthy in this letter is that the followers of the tariqa and its leaders now declared that they were an independent government with their own Emir persumbl the Mullah, a Sultan, Nur persumbly and subject, naturally the clans that frequented Kob Fardod Dolbahanta, Habr Tol J'alaa and the eastern Habr Yunis.

It is unknown when exactly the tribal followers of the Kob Fardod tariqa and their leaders adopted the term "dervish", but the general time was at the end of April 1899. Sadler, updating the colonial office, sent the following updates on the progress of the movement in mid-June 1899;

Sultan Nur returned to his country at the end of June 1899 after more than three months sojourn in Kob Fardod. On June 27 Sadler sent a letter to him, Sadler did not mention what exactly was said in the letter but from Sultan Nur's reaction, the content of the letter was not to his liking. He immediately arrested the camel sowar and stripped him of his gun. Hayes Sadler updating the colonial office of the new development:

Having failed to win over the western section of his tribe for the rebellion and the tribal assembly planned for July 22 having been aborted by Mullah Haji Musa of Hahia (head Mullah of the Ahmediyya tariqa at Hahi), Sultan Nur for the last time left to the east and to Burao and joined the eastern section of the rebellious tribe in his eastern headquarters. A few weeks later, at the end of August, the dervish and their clan followers assembled at Burao, the Mullah with his followers from the Dolbahanata, the various Habr Toljaala sub-clans with their principal headmen (Haji Sudi, Deria Arale, Deria Gure and Duale Adle) and Sultan Nur with his followers from eastern Habr Yunis clan, declared open hostility. The assembled dervish and their clan allies sent the following stern letter to Captain Cordeaux and James Hayes Sadler:

After assembling at Burao the Dervish and their clan allies, the Adan Madoba, Rer Yusuf, Ali Gheri, Jama Siad and the Musa Ismail what the Sadler calls forces from the Dhulbahnate in his correspondence attacked the western Habr Yunis at Odweina in September 1899 under the insistence of Sultan Nur to punish the clansmen who opposed his call to join the rebellion and instead heeded the rival tribal mullah Haji Musa. Having punished the western Habr Yunis their next target was the Ahmadia Tariqa at Sheikh. They burned and looted the tariqa about the end of September, the various dervish clan followers dispersed and the core dervish moved back once they came. The Mullah and Sultan Nur apparently had a disagreement and they and their followers separated, the Mullah to Lasder with his Ali Gheri and the principle Dervish of the Aden Madoba including Haji Sudi while Sultan Nur with the Musa Ismail and Rer Yusuf moved to the Arori plains and the various Habar Tojalaa followers camped at Ber.

During this time the Dolbahnata chief Girad Ali Farah sent a letter to the British Coastal administration disavowing the Mullah and the Dervish. In October the chief of the Dolbahnata, Girad Ali Farah, was murdered by the Dervish. Through the end of 1899 most of the earlier tribal followers of the Dervish made their peace with the coastal administration, all deputations from Dolbahnata, Habr Yunis and Habr Tojalaa made peace. The core Dervish elements however crossed the border into Ethiopia in November 1899 and settled at Harradiggit (Hara-Digeed) along with their leaders.

Once the Dervish settled in Harradiggit and Milmil throughout 1900 with total followers around 1,000 of Ali Geri, Ogaden and 200 Midgans, the Dervish raided the local clans. They raided the Aidagale in July 1900, followed by a devastating raid on Samanter Abdillah and Ahmed Abdillah (Habr Awal) in September 1900, killing over 220 men, women and children. The affected tribesmen then raided the Dervish at Milmil and Harradiggit, also the Abyssinians began to raid the Dervish around the same time. Finally, in March 1901, the Dervish were compelled to go back to their old settlement and they crossed the border back into Somaliland and settled in Samala (Sacmala) a village near Buhoodle. The British administrations by then had assembled enough tribal forces, mostly from tribes that had been looted and massacred by the Dervish. Led by twenty-two British officers and trained by Indian drill officers, the tribal forces then ready to battle the Dervish.

The British and dervish wars 1901–1904

Samala battle June 2–3, 1901, known as Afbakayle in Somali

Before dispatching forces to face the Dervish at Samala Consul-General Hayes Salder made the following instructions to the overall commander of the forces

Eric John Eagles Swayne:

By December 1900, 21 officers of the British and Indian army with a force of 1,500 Somali Levy from the looted tribes were ready to operate against the dervish in 1901. To prevent the Dervish from fleeing west across the Ethiopian border, Ethiopian cooperation was sought and the Abyssinian king sent a force of 8,000 soldiers in January 1901, the Ethiopian operations began at once, three months before the British expeditions, the Ethiopians managed to push the dervish across the Somaliland border and punish the clans who were involved in assisting the dervish.

On May 22 Swayne's forces on their way burned the entire settlement of Kob Fardod leaving only the mosque. Their next operation was to punish clans that supported the Mullah, they seized 3,500 camels from the Habr Toljaalaa Adan Madoba  and the Dolbahanta Jama Siad. On June 2 these tribes, along with dervish forces, attacked McNeill's zariba at Samala to recapture their herds. On the afternoon of June 2, the dervish attacked McNeil's encampment (zeriba) with a force of some five hundred horse and two thousand foot. The dervish leaders Haji Sudi, Sultan Nur and the Mullah watched the battle from a nearby hill. After have been repulsed with many casualties, the dervish attacked the same night with no avail, on the 3rd of June the following morning at 9:00.A.M the dervish attacked with 5000 strong not been able to get anywhere near the zariba before having been shot, the dervish forces were broken, in the two-day fighting the dervish lost 150 dead on the battlefield and counted on the actual scene, the British further claimed they have killed six hundreds, counted dead men who died on the road between Weylahed (weyl-lagu-xidh here where the subsequently the dervish came face to face with Swayne's flying column) and Ana Hargili (Caana-Xadhigle). McNeil lost 18 in killed and wounded.

Failing to regain their stocks, both the dervish and their clan allies retreated on June 3. Subsequently, it came to the knowledge of Swayne that the Mullah initially wanted to attack Swayne's zariba, but Sultan Nur persuaded the dervish that an attack on McNeill's zariba would yield some 400 rifles. The fleeing Dervish accidentally encountered the column of Swayne on the 4th of June, here at Weylahed a small skirmishes took place ending with a prolonged chase of the fleeing scattered dervish horsemen, but the dervish managed to escape. The pursuit continued until the dervish crossed into the Haud. A reporter from The London Times on June 22, 1901, sent a report of the campaigns describing the next encounter after Samala:

Subsequently, the British forces concluded from the dervish dead the implicated clans and found out that the bulk of the dervish forces at Samala were of the sub clans of Kayat, Aadan Madoba, Rer Hagar, Ali Gheri, Nur Ahmed, Jama Siad, and Mijjarten. On June 19 Sawayne decided to punish the refractory clans by ceasing their herds, the Jama Siad and Rer Hagar easily came to terms, by July 8 the operations concluded where the Ali Gheri losing some 60 men and some 6,000 camels the last clans came to submission and their elders came to Berbera.

Ferdiddin July 17, 1901 
Recrossing the border from the Haud into Italian Somalia in the Mudug region, the Mullah collected his most fanatical followers the real dervish (men who were mostly mullahs and under oath to fight to the end as opposed to tribal opportunistic clan allies), the dervish withdrew from Mudug and arrived back into British Somaliland and encamped in Beretabli. Swayne arriving at Courgerod with his forces made contacts with the rear of the enemies and spies later discover the bulk of the enemy forces were in force in Firidddin. Swayne chose to attack at early down travelling through the night, with 700 men 75 mounted and 100 left behind to guard the supplies, Swayne attacked with 600 men and 350 Dolbahnata tribesmen, they attacked the Dervish at Ferdiddin. Sawyne described the fight at Firdiddin in his official correspondence:

Gaibdeed and two of his sons (been the brother of Haji Sudi and nephews) were among the leaders killed. The dervish lost a large numbers of well known mullahs and over 60 bodies counted. The fleeing dervish fared no better after five days in the waterless Haud many died and Haji Sudi, the Mullah and his eldest son only survived by water from the stomach of slaughtered camels.  After the defeat the enemy fled south across the Italian border and were pursued some miles the forces had to stop to regroup. Short of water and some 50 miles away from their nearest supplies Swayne was compelled to abort the pursuit. Facing the authentic dervish mostly mullahs, Swayne was impressed by their tenacity and ferocity, commenting:

Erigo/Erego October 6–7, 1902, known as Beer-dhiga battle in Somali

In December 1901 the Dervish raided the a sub sections of the Habr Tojaalaa and on February 1, 1902, news reached the Somaliland protectorate British authority that the Dervish were planning a raid against the tribes from their positions east of the protectorate. On February 7 and 13, the dervishes waged a devastating attack on Habr Yunis and Dolbahnata tribes men east of Burao. The London Gazette reported "On the 7th February, the Mullah had despatched another raiding force against our Jama Siad friendly tribes, 100 miles to the east of the scene of his raid of the 13th February, and here again our tribes suffered heavily. Burao and Berbera became filled with destitute refugees and 2000 persons were fed daily at Burao alone." 1903

On the first week of October the Somali and Yoas led by few British officers at last arrived within the reach of their enemies. They formed a Zariba in a clearing Awan Eergo in a very dense bush, and around 4 pm the enemy were hiding in all the surrounding bushes. The British led forces were compelled to advance slowly, immediately the Dervish attacked from all directions causing the British led forces front line to fall back in a disarray, but the rear companies stood firm holding their position, the 2nd King African Rifles and 6th King Africans Rifles in the extreme right and left, however, fell back in a sudden panic, rescued by one-half company in the front the troops rallied and held their ground under intense fire. In the severity of the fight the transport camels stampeded with the 2nd African Rifles and two Somali companies Ltd Swayne managed to push the enemies for 2 miles and recover 1,800 of the transport camels. in the aftermath of the battle it was discovered a maxim gun was missing, casualties included 2 officers killed and 56 levies. Both the Somali and Yoa performed great in the 6th but on the 7th of October the severity of the fight sunk their spirit and the officers leading the forces complained that they couldn't rely on their men. The dervish in the other hand lost greatly, some 62 death 40 of them Hajis and Mullahs and all 6 commanders of their force were killed,

In the western side of the protectorate the highest Somali native officer Risaldar-major Musa Farah attacked the dervish tribal allies, 
"By June 10, Musa Farah's detached Levy of 450 rifles had reached Kurmis. After collecting 5,000 tribesmen from the western side of the Protectorate, Musa Farah had transported them across the waterless Haud where it was over 100 miles broad, had attacked the western Dervish encampments, had routed them in all directions, and had finally succeeded in transporting his force back across the Haud, together with his captured livestock, amounting to 1,630 camels, 200 cows, and 2,000 sheep. For this service His Majesty King Edward VII rewarded the Risaldar-Major with a sword of honour."

At the conclusion of the first and second expeditions, the British administrations and the colonial office were satisfied at the conclusion of the first two expeditions, despite the leaders of the Dervish having not all been either killed or captured. Gabriel Ferrand, the Vice-Council of France following these events observed that "Neither the Mahdi nor his chief advisor Ahmed Warsama, better known under the name Haji Sudi, nor the Sultan Nur,leader of the Habr Younis clan were killed or captured. The optimism Colonel Sadler and Lieutenant-Colonel Swayne in the latest reports relating to military operations is inexplicable."

Gumburu April 17, 1903 and Daratoleh April 22, 1903

The third expedition was launched January 3, 1903 with a new commander, Sir William Henry Manning. The plane was to encircle and trap the dervish from all sides. The main body of the forces were to advance from Obbia in Italian Somalia to the wells of Galkayo while one land at Berbera and form lines through Bohotleh. The dervish leaders, upon hearing news of the Obbia forces landing with a body of horsemen, left for Milmil and Haradiggitt rallying tribal allies:

Towards the end of March news reached the British forces of whereabouts the bulk of the dervish forces.  Defectors and captives claimed the dervish forces were in Galadi.  A reconnaissance patrol led by captain Plunkett was sent by Manning to Galadi where they met the bulk of the dervish forces majority made of Somali Bantu clans of the Makana and Derjele tribes. Between 16 and 17 April the British small forces made up of Somalis, Indians and Yaos were encircled from all directions and decimated. All 9 officers were killed and 89 rank and file were killed.  The battle took place in a small hill Gumburu close to Galadi. Before the news of the disaster at Gumburu made it to the British forces another column from Bohotleh forces engaged another dervish forces at Daratoleh the later forces were defeated by the British forces. John Gough (VC) The bulk of the main dervish forces without their tribal allies moved to Halin in June 1903; according to the intelligence report of the period:

"A deserter from the enemy stated that the Mullah. accompanied by Haji Sudi and Sultan Nur, with a large force of horse and footmen, reached Kurmis on 8th June, camped near Lasakante on 9 June, and moved towards Dannot early on 10 June on their way towards the Nogal. On 12th June mounted scout could not get through from Bohotle to Dannot owing to the numbers of the enemy's horsemen watching the road. On 13th June two deserters from the mullah came into Bohotle and stated that the Mullah with his whole force was on his way to Nogal with a view of establishing his Haroun at Halin. Intelligence Report from 11th July 1903".

August 4, 1903 – a deserter from the Mullah, named Abbas Isman (Ibrahim), came into Bohotle at 5.30 a.m. His story is as follows Haji Sudi is still his trusted adviser. Sultan Nur still lives with the Mullah, but no longer is keen to help him. Abbas was with the Mullah at Wardair during the fight. When the fight was over a horseman galloped to Wardair and announced that the English had been wiped out. The Mullah immediately mounted his pony, Dodimer and rode hard to the field of battle. The Mullah was absent from the battle and much of the command of the dervish fighters fell upon Sultan Nur. This fact caused the rift between the Mullah and Sultan Nur which the informant alluded to in his report.

These two encounters, despite a heavy loss by the dervish, were the only dervish victory over the British forces.

Jidballi January 10, 1904

This was not the mere handful they had fought at Samala, at Gumburu, or at Daratoleh. It was no reconnaissance, nor yet was it a hastily recruited tribal levy such as they had faced at Ferdhiddin or Erigo. In comparison, General Egerton's force at Jidbali must have seemed to them a mighty army; and, in very truth, it comprised some of the best seasoned British, Indian, and African troops at the Empire's disposal. On the other hand, the Darwishes numbered from 6000 to 8000 fighting men, representing the pick of the Mullah's forces.

The command of the British forces was taken over by major-general Charles Egerton with fresh reinforcement from India and Aden, on July 4, 1903, Egerton arrived at Berbera. From his arrival to mid October Egerton was engaged in improving roads, building an advance bases at kirrit and improving water supplies. Also Egerton raised two more Somali irregular mounted corps, the Gedabursi Horse (500 men from the Gedabursi clan) and the Tribal Horse (mainly from eastern Habr Yunis, Habr Tojalaa and Dolbahnata clans). Meanwhile, the dervish were encamped at Halin-Gerrowei-Kalis line of villages and they made Halin their main headquarter. In October the Dervish occupied the small port at Illig in the Mijjertein coast.

Manning was given orders to occupy Galadi and by end of November 1903 Galadi was occupied without incidents. The water was insufficient, Manning left a detachments there and stationed the bulk of his troops at Bohotle.
The first clashes between the Dervish and British forces occurred in December 1903 when news came that the Dervish camp was formed at Jidbali. Egerton ordered lieutenant-Colonel Kenna to make a reconnaissances and to induce the Dervish in an engagement.  Coming upon many dervish camp fires at Jidbali, Kenna opened fire in an attempt to dislodge the dervishes from their zaribas. After three hours of periodic fires Kenna withdrew estimating the enemy to be around 1,500 foot and 200 horsemen.

On January 9, Egerton assembled his massive forces 20 miles east of Badwein having ascertained the dervish were in force in Jidbali. On 10 January 1904, the dervish for the first time fought regular troops in an open country, also in terms of numbers of troops the British forces were the largest thus far. The Mullah was not present in the battle, he was curiously absent. Sending Kenna to the flank of the enemy to block any retreats, Egerton opened his mountain battery guns orderings his troops to kneel or lay down. Upon the commencing of the fight the dervish rushed from cover to cover to through grass and brushes attacking the left. However they were unable to stand the intensity of the fire, the dervish again regrouped and tried to attack from the front and the right. Sergeant Gibbs did an excellent job with the maxim gun, and the K.A.R and Sikh firing was remarkable, with in few minutes the dervish line collapsed and they retreated in full flight, pursued by the mounted Gedabursi Horses and Tribal Horses the rout of the dervish army was completed.

Pestalozza Agreement 1904–1905

 {{Blockquote|As the Mahdi of Khartoum and his lieutenant Osman Digna, H'àdjdj Mohammed ben Abdallah and his lieutenant H'àdjdj Soudi frequently write to the head of the British Protectorate and the commander of the expeditionary corps. They once offered peace on payment of compensation by Britain and the assignment of a port.

At least as far back as in 1903 as Ferrand Gebriel noted the dervish offered terms for peace to the British.Pressured by the English and the Mijertein Somalis whom in their territory the dervish carved out a settlement, after consulting with his dervish and religious rebels, at last the dervish were desperate for peace and willing to negotiate. In 1904 the Mullah wrote to the Italians through Abdilahi Shahri a trusted dervish and his boyhood friend.<ref>Interview Held At Berbera on the 30 April and 1 May 1909, with Abdulla Shahari, Formerly the intimate friend and emissary of the Mullah''. Annex-4, SAD 125/6/130. University of Durham, Sudan archives</ref>}} These initiative for these negotiations, started by the Mullah himself who wrote three letters in March 1904 to Lt. Vessel Spagna, commander of the Italian squad in Bender-Cassin. In August 1904; and from Aden, embarking on the royal ship Volturno, Pestalozza went to Bender Cassem, on the northern Somali coast, to feel the ground, and to send a courier to Mullah, who was in Upper Nogal, benefiting from these practices, as an intermediary, certainly Abdallah Sceri, a trusted man of Mullah himself, who had employed him in various missions. During the war, the British had captured him as a suspect, and then had to hand him over to the Italian consular authority, having claimed in his capacity as an Italian protégé. Councilor Abdallah Sheri was kept on board the Volturno, in a state of arrest, not allowed by the British Authorities to have relations with the natives in Aden and on the coast. He was the chief auxiliary of Pestalozza to the success of his mission.

Giulio Pestalozza in his second meeting with the dervish October 17, 1904  was accompanied by Sylos and Paladini, two fellow Italians. After the second meeting the Mullah declared to Sheri and Pestalozza the following:

After a long, three-way negotiation between the powers of Britain, Italy, Ethiopia and the Dervish, the British received a dervish delegation for a peace agreement:

1. Abdallah Shihiri, Habr Toljaala, Adan Madhoba;
2. Diria Arraleh, Habr Toljaala, Adan Madhoba;
3. Adem Egal, Mejertein, Rer Egaleh;
4. Moallem Mohamed Nur, Dolbahante Kayet.

On March 5, 1905, the treaty of Ilig or the Pestalozza agreement was signed between the dervish and the powers, the dervish represented by Sultan Nur and other dignitaries, who signed the final agreements. In the original Arabic, the following signatures appear - Sultan Nur Ahmed (the chief dervish sultan) and his brother Geele Ahmed (Kila Ahmed), Ugas Diria Arabe and Ugas Issa Farek''.

The Dervish were now technically an Italian protected religious community, they had their own semi-autonomous enclave, the dervish agreed to live peacefully with their Miijerteyn neighbours, the Ethiopians and the British. The Italians granted a fixed sea access for the Dervish between Ras Garad and Ras Gabbe with an Italian representative as a governor with soldiers and custom house, till such representative arrive the Mullah himself shall act as an Italian agent. The Italians assigned the Nogal and Hawd in the Italian sphere of influence as a territory accessible to the dervish, in the English sphere the dervish were only granted grazing for their cattle in British Somaliland Nogal in the area limited by the wells of Halin, Hodin, Tifafale and Damot. On March 24, 1905, the four Dervish Representative and the commissioner of Somaliland Protectorate reaffirmed the March 5, 1905 Pestalozza and Dervish agreement.

Less than a year of the agreement, the dervish and the Mullah were back to their usual raids and general looting, the Mullah was not satisfied with the financial outcome of the agreement. In 1906 Eugenio Cappello the Italian council in Aden went with the usual Abdallah Sceri, to the Mullah who told him, openly, that Italy had failed in all the promises made to him by Pestalozza. "You promised me money," he said, "and I haven't seen it; you promised me that Osman Mahmud would bring down the fort, as this sort of surveillance that exercises on my movements annoys me and he has not done so: you promised me gifts, and the gifts did not come.

Sultan Nur's death, 1907

The last intelligence report mention of Sultan Nur in the Italian archives was in 1907. After the death of Sultan Nur 1907/1908 in the dervish camp at Illig, his son Dolal Sultan Nur ascended the sultanate in the dervish camp, while among the non-dervish Habr Yunis clans, Jama Sultan Hirsi Aman (the son of Sultan Hersi Aman circa 1824–1879), the first cousin of Sultan Nur, was proclaimed a sultan.

Sultan Nur was buried by his dervish in a large, domed tomb in Taleh, his tomb predated the later dervish forts. His white tomb in the dervish capital is a testimony to his contribution to the movement. Only four dervish founders are commemorated in Taleh Nur included. William Archibald Macfadyen, a British geologist and the only scholar to study the structures of Taleh fort, mentioned the handful of tombs constructed by the dervish for their leaders and gave a detailed description of the tombs in 1931. In his article Macfayden only identified Sultan Nur's tomb by name out of the four dervish entombed in Taleh:

Modern Somali Dervish revisionism, 1974–1991

Despite such high regard by his dervish contemporaries, Sultan Nur and most of the non-Daarood dervishes were entirely expunged from Somali history. Aw Jama Umar Ise and his assistant Ahmed Farah Ali Idaja and the rest of the Somali Academy of Sciences and Arts. The Somali Academy of Sciences and Arts (Mogadishu, Somalia), a government institution, in 1976 printed the official Somali version of dervish history (Taariikhdii daraawiishta iyo Sayid Maxamad Cabdille Xasan, 1895–1920. 1976) by Aw Jama Umar Ise (Aw-Jama Omar Isse). In that official Somali account, Sultan Nur appears in but one sentence in the book.

Said S. Samatar in his book (Oral Poetry and Somali Nationalism: The Case of Sayid Mahammad 'Abdille Hasan. 2009), basically a translation of the official Somali version into English, passingly reduced the role of Sultan Nur in the dervish rebellion to one paragraph in which he claimed Mohammed Abdullah Hassan deposed Sultan Nur as the head of the Habr Yunis clan and replaced him with another sultan, a claim that he fails to substantiate by any citation. In other versions of his dissertations which later were published as a book, he claimed Sultan Nur used the influence of Mohammed Abdullah Hassan to outset his rival Madar Hersi.

Abdi Sheik Abdi, another Somali author of a book about the dervish (Divine madness: Moḥammed ʻAbdulle Ḥassan (1856–1920). 1993.), again essentially reduced the Dervish history into a clan narrative, where one side was in British lines and the other clan in dervish sides, further contributing to the single-clan-based dervish Somali narrative widely propagated by the late dictator Mohammed Siad Bare, where one clan was depicted as anti-colonial and nationalist while the rest, in particular the Isaaq (Sultan Nur's clan), was depicted as a British collaborators. Abdi Sheik Abdi minces no words in his book applying the word "collaborators" to the Isaaq and despite the majority of his Daarood clan's presence in the anti-dervish camp and British and Italian camp, he never uses such term to describe their position.

The late dictator himself Siad Barre believed in the clan-based narrative of the dervish, where the dervish story is reduced to a Daarood struggle against Great Britain, according to the former chief of the Somali police and the author of (The cost of dictatorship: the Somali experience) the Somali dictator believed that he was the new Mad Mullah incarnate and that the Isaaq were responsible for the defeat of his "hero" Mohammed Abdullah Hassan.

The Dervish historiography in Somali society was dominated by a one clan, virtually all of the Somali authors of the dervish, history and poetry hailed from Siad Barre's clan, with the exception of Musa Haji Ismail Galal. The clan used the state resources to turn Somali history into what Professor Ali Jimale Ahmed called a process of "dervishization" of Somali history to the exclusion of all others. This one-sided narrative dominated Somali media, school curriculum and even public discourse. During the civil war, Bashir Goeth, a Somali author from the Gedabursi clan which during the civil war was allied with Siad Barre clan against the Isaaq and SNM, called for the destruction of the what he called "Isaaq the troublesome child", in his article Goeth used the Dervish one-sided narrative to depict the Isaaq as "traitor"s. He opened his diatribe with the following paragraph:
... I will try to tackle the Isaq threat to Somalism, starting from their stand on the Dervish Movement to the present situation in a historical perspective. I will not even go into details to include some of their terrorist activities such as hijacking a Somali ship in 1961 and a national carrier in 1966 and again in 1987. The Dervish Movement, led by Sayyid Mohamed Abdulle Hassan, started the first Somali patriotic struggle against the colonialists. This nationalist movement which entered a long and a bloody war with three foreign powers, namely the British, the Italians and the Ethiopian kingdom, would have been victorious if the Isaq clan did not conspire against it with the British administration. The British government armed the Isaq – the ‘friendlies’ as they were called (Lewis, I. M: The Modem History of Somaliland; Weidenfeld and Nicolson, London, 1965) – to fight against Sayyid Mohamed's nationalist movement. They also spied on and guided the British forces to the Dervish bases. The Isaq had even sent several unsuccessful missions to Sayyid Mohamed Abdulle Hassan on the pretext of mediating between him and the British but each time they asked him to surrender. Sayyid Mohamed never yielded to the Isaq games and even punished them on several occasions for their treachery and cooperation with the colonialists.

Dervish history was used and disseminated as clan propaganda and minor foot soldiers and latecomers into the dervish camps were elevated above the original founders of the movement and supplanted them all, thanks to the Siad Bare's government's overhaul of Dervish history. Ismail Mire (circa 1880s-1961) was promoted in the early years of Siad Bare's rule as the commander and lieutenant and right-hand man of the movement replacing Haji Sudi.

See also
Haji Sudi
Abdallah Shihiri
Sultan Deria Hassan
Mohammed Abdullah Hassan
Dervish state
Sharmarke Ali Saleh
Sheikh Madar
Garhajis
Isaaq

References

1841 births
1907 deaths
19th-century Somalian people
19th-century monarchs in Africa
20th-century Somalian people
20th-century monarchs in Africa
Somali sultans
Somalian religious leaders
Somalian Muslims